The Howling is a 1981 American horror film directed by Joe Dante. It is based on the novel of the same name by Gary Brandner. The film stars Dee Wallace, Patrick Macnee, Dennis Dugan, and Robert Picardo.

The Howling was released in the United States on March 13, 1981, and became a moderate success, grossing $17.9 million at the box office. It received generally positive reviews, with praise for the makeup special effects by Rob Bottin. The film won the 1980 Saturn Award for Best Horror Film while still in development, and was one of the three high-profile werewolf-themed horror films released in 1981, alongside An American Werewolf in London and Wolfen.

Its financial success aided Dante's career, and prompted Warner Bros. to hire Dante (as director) and Michael Finnell (as producer) for Gremlins. A series consisting of seven sequels arose from the film's success. A remake is in development, with Andy Muschietti set to direct.

Plot
Karen White is a Los Angeles television news anchor who is being stalked by serial killer Eddie Quist. In cooperation with the police, she takes part in a scheme to capture Eddie by agreeing to meet him in a sleazy porn theater. Eddie forces Karen to watch a video of a young woman being bound and raped, and when Karen turns around to see Eddie, she screams. The police enter and shoot Eddie, and although Karen is safe, she suffers amnesia. Her therapist, Dr. George Waggner, decides to send her and her husband, Bill Neill, to the "Colony", a secluded resort in the countryside where he sends patients for treatment.

The Colony is filled with strange characters, and one, a sultry nymphomaniac named Marsha, tries to seduce Bill. When he resists her unsubtle sexual overtures, he is attacked and scratched on the arm by a werewolf while returning to his cabin. After Bill's attack, Karen summons her friend, Terri Fisher, to the Colony, and Terri connects the resort to Eddie through a sketch he left behind, having previously discovered that Eddie's body disappeared from the morgue. Karen begins to suspect that Bill is hiding a secret far more threatening than marital infidelity. Later that night, Bill meets Marsha at a campfire in the woods. While having sex in the moonlight, they undergo a frightening transformation into werewolves.

While investigating the next morning, Terri is attacked by a werewolf in a cabin, though she escapes after cutting the monster's hand off with an ax. She runs to Wagner's office and places a phone call to her boyfriend Chris Halloran, who has been alerted about the Colony's true nature. While on the phone with Chris, Terri looks for files on Eddie Quist. When she finally finds the file in the filing cabinet, she is attacked by Eddie in werewolf form, and is killed when she is bitten on the jugular vein. Chris hears this on the other end and sets off for the Colony armed with silver bullets.

Karen is confronted by the resurrected Eddie Quist once again, and Eddie transforms himself into a werewolf in front of her. In response, Karen splashes Eddie in the face with corrosive acid and flees. Later, as Chris arrives at the Colony, he is confronted by the horribly disfigured Eddie, who is fatally shot by Chris with a silver bullet when he attempts to transform. However, it turns out all the people in the Colony are werewolves and can shapeshift at will, without the need of a full moon to do so. Karen and Chris survive their attacks and burn the Colony to the ground. As they drive away, however, one werewolf breaks into their car and bites Karen before being shot by Chris, turning back into Bill as he dies.

Karen resolves to warn the entire world about the existence of werewolves and begins a special worldwide broadcast announcement to the people around the world. Then, to prove her story, she herself transforms into a werewolf. She is shot at by Chris in front of a live viewing audience, although the people watching the transformation from their television sets around the world are amused, believing it to be just a stunt done with special effects. Marsha, who escaped the Colony herself completely unscathed, sits at a bar with a man who, while watching the special broadcast announcement, orders a pepper steak for himself and a rare hamburger for Marsha after Karen's display cuts to a commercial break.

Cast

 Dee Wallace as Karen White
 Patrick Macnee as Dr. George Waggner
 Dennis Dugan as Chris Halloran
 Christopher Stone as R. William "Bill" Neill
 Belinda Balaski as Terri Fisher
 Kevin McCarthy as Fred Francis
 John Carradine as Erle Kenton
 Slim Pickens as Sam Newfield
 Elisabeth Brooks as Marsha Quist
 Robert Picardo as Eddie Quist
 Margie Impert as Donna
 Noble Willingham as Charlie Barton
 James Murtaugh as Jerry Warren
 Jim McKrell as Lew Landers
 Kenneth Tobey as Older Cop
 Dick Miller as Walter Paisley
 Meshach Taylor as Shantz
 Don McLeod as T.C. Quist

Production
Though the film has been noted for its semi-humorous screenplay, it was adapted from a more straightforward novel by Gary Brandner which was first published in 1977. After drafts by Jack Conrad (the original director who left following difficulties with the studio) and Terence H. Winkless proved unsatisfactory, director Joe Dante hired John Sayles to completely rewrite the script. The two had collaborated before on Dante's 1978 film Piranha. Sayles rewrote the script with the same self-aware, satirical tone that he gave Piranha, and his finished draft bears only a vague resemblance to Brandner's book. However, Winkless still received a co-writer's credit along with Sayles for his work on the screenplay.

The cast featured a number of recognizable character actors, such as Kevin McCarthy, John Carradine, Kenneth Tobey and Slim Pickens, many of whom appeared in genre films themselves. Additionally, the film was full of in-joke references (see 'Tributes' below). Roger Corman makes a cameo appearance as a man standing outside a phone booth, as does John Sayles, appearing as a morgue attendant and James Murtaugh as one of the members of the Colony. Forrest J Ackerman appears in a brief cameo in an occult bookstore, clutching a copy of an issue of his magazine Famous Monsters of Filmland.

The Howling was also notable for its special effects, which were state-of-the-art at the time. The transformation scenes were created by Rob Bottin, who had also worked with Dante on Piranha. Rick Baker was the original effects artist for the film, but left the production to work on the John Landis film An American Werewolf in London, handing over the effects work to Bottin. Bottin's most celebrated effect was the on-screen transformation of Eddie Quist, which involved air bladders under latex facial applications to give the illusion of transformation. Variety claimed that The Howlings biggest flaw is that the impact of this initial transformation is never topped during the climax of the film. The Howling also features stop-motion animation by David W. Allen, and puppetry intended to give the werewolves an even more non-human look. Despite most of the special effects at the time, the silhouette of Bill and Marsha having sex as werewolves is obviously a cartoon animation. Dante attributed this to budgetary reasons.

Due to their work in The Howling, Dante and producer Michael Finnell received the opportunity to make the film Gremlins (1984) for Steven Spielberg. That film references The Howling with a smiley face image on a refrigerator door. Eddie Quist leaves yellow smiley face stickers as his calling card in several places throughout The Howling. Also, Jim McKrell's character as news reporter Lew Landers appears in both The Howling and Gremlins.

Music
Pino Donaggio composed the score which featured classic orchestral horror melodies with minimal synth sounds. Waxwork Records released the full soundtrack on a double LP in 2017. The album art was done by Francesco Francavilla.

Differences from Brandner's novel

The plot and characters of the film deviate from the original novel in many ways:

 In the novel, Karen White is called Karyn Beatty, her husband is called Roy Beatty (as opposed to Bill Neill in the film), and neither Karyn nor Roy work in television.
 In the novel, Karyn is raped by a man in her apartment, whereas in the film she is saved by the police before being attacked by a werewolf in an adult bookstore.
 In the novel, Karyn's psychiatrist is only briefly mentioned, while in the film he is a major character by the name of Dr. Waggner.
 In the novel, Karyn goes to recuperate at Drago, a mountain village in California; in the film she goes instead to "the Colony", a health resort run by her psychiatrist Dr. ⁠Waggner.
 Karyn's rapist in the novel is named Max Quist and he is an ex-con who has no involvement with the village of Drago or its inhabitants. In the film, Karen's (attempted) attacker is named Eddie Quist and is already affiliated with the Colony before he meets Karen.
 Marsha Quist's name in the novel is Marcia Lura, a shopkeeper in Drago, and she is not a relative of Max Quist.
 In the novel, Karyn and Roy bring their pet dog Lady with them to the village, and she is killed later on; in the film they have no dog, nor any pet.
 The werewolves in the novel are described as resembling actual wolves (but greater in both size and ferocity). The werewolves of the film are more anthropomorphic, and can walk on their hind legs; standing over seven feet tall.
 The werewolves in the novel are never seen in the daytime; in fact, they transform every night once the sun has gone down. The werewolves in the film can transform at will at any time of the day or night, and are indeed seen during daylight hours.
 In the novel, the character Chris Halloran is Roy's best friend. In the film, Chris works with Karen and Bill at the television station. Karen's friend Terri (Chris' girlfriend, who also works at the station) is an original character for the film and is not featured in the novel at all.
 In the novel, Karyn escapes from Drago physically unharmed (albeit mentally traumatized) and survives after being rescued by Chris Halloran. In the film, she gets bitten by her husband Bill after he transforms into a werewolf, prompting Karyn's later transformation into one herself and Chris' shooting her with a silver bullet, both on live television (leading to the film's ambiguous ending as to whether the shot struck true, as the television news program broadcasting these events to the public is cut at the critical moment).

Tributes
Notable for its semi-humorous screenplay, director Joe Dante put many in-joke references in the film, including numerous references to wolves: The Big Bad Wolf from Ub Iwerks' Little Boy Blue (1936) is seen on TV; Sheriff Newfield is seen eating Wolf Brand Chili and a similar can is seen on the counter in Eddie's cabin; a copy of the Allen Ginsberg book Howl appears; a mention of disc jockey Wolfman Jack; a bottle of Wolfen-brand medicine on the counter from which Karen picks up the acid; and in Karen and Bill's cabin there is a picture of a wolf who killed a sheep from within the flock.

Many characters in the film are named after horror film directors who directed other films that featured werewolves, including George Waggner, who directed The Wolf Man (1941). Others include Roy William Neill (Frankenstein Meets the Wolf Man, 1943), Terence Fisher (The Curse of the Werewolf, 1961), Freddie Francis (Legend of the Werewolf, 1975), Erle Kenton (House of Dracula, 1945, which co-stars John Carradine, who plays Kenton in The Howling), Sam Newfield (The Mad Monster, 1942), Charles Barton (Abbott and Costello Meet Frankenstein, 1948), Jacinto Molina (La Marca del Hombre Lobo, 1968) and Lew Landers (The Return of the Vampire, 1943).

Dick Miller's bookstore owner Walter Paisley gets his name from Miller's starring role in the low-budget horror film A Bucket of Blood (1959). Also present in the bookstore is the mummified grandmother in an armchair from the attic of the house in the original version of the film The Texas Chain Saw Massacre.

The film's screenwriter and future director John Sayles, Dante's former producer Roger Corman (who directed A Bucket of Blood), and science fiction and horror film personality Forrest J Ackerman all have cameos.

Finance
IFI agreed to provide 50% of the finance. Goldcrest Films had a partnership with IFI. They ended up providing £145,000 to the budget of The Howling and receiving £396,000, making a profit of £251,000.

Release
The film opened on March 13, 1981, in 170 theatres in New York City, Philadelphia and the Washington D.C.—Baltimore area.

Critical response

On the review aggregator website Rotten Tomatoes, The Howling holds a 74% approval rating based on 42 critic reviews, with an average rating of 6.4/10. The consensus reads: "The Howling packs enough laughs into its lycanthropic carnage to distinguish it from other werewolf entries, with impressive visual effects adding some bite".

In 1981, Roger Ebert's 2-out-of-4 star review described The Howling as the "silliest film seen in some time", but Ebert also said the special effects were good and the film was perhaps "worth your money, IF you get it two for one". Gene Siskel liked the film and gave it three and a half stars out of four. In his Movie Guide, Leonard Maltin wrote that The Howling is a "hip, well-made horror film" and noted the humorous references to classic werewolf cinema. Variety praised both the film's sense of humor and its traditional approach to horror. Kim Newman, in his 1988 book Nightmare Movies, called The Howling "a brisk chiller that effortlessly revives the prowling-through-misty-forests genre", and called Picardo's transformation sequence "the movies' most impressive werewolf monster".

The film won the 1980 Saturn Award for Best Horror Film. This film was also #81 on Bravo's 100 Scariest Movie Moments.

Box office
The film grossed $1,160,172 in its opening weekend. Per Varietys weekly chart, based on a sample of 20-24 markets, the film was ranked number one for the week; however, Back Roads, which opened in 635 more theatres, grossed more nationally, with $3 million. The Howling grossed $17.9 million in the United States and Canada.

Home video
Shout! Factory re-released The Howling on DVD and Blu-ray on June 18, 2013 through their Scream Factory imprint. The film was previously released to DVD by MGM (owners of the video and TV distribution rights to The Howling due to the distribution deal with StudioCanal and Sony Pictures, the current owners of the AVCO Embassy library) on August 26, 2003 as a Region 1 widescreen Special Edition DVD.

Sequels and remake

There have been seven sequels to The Howling. In May 2015, a newly formed production company bought the rights to the original film and were working on a ninth film, a remake of the original. In 2020, Andy Muschietti was hired to direct the remake for Netflix.

A comic book series by Space Goat Productions entitled The Howling: Revenge of the Werewolf Queen''''' began publication in May 2017, acting as a direct sequel to the original film, ignoring the film sequels.

Notes

References

External links

 
 
 
 
 
 
 

1981 films
1981 horror films
1980s supernatural horror films
1980s serial killer films
American supernatural horror films
American independent films
Embassy Pictures films
1980s English-language films
Films directed by Joe Dante
Films set in Los Angeles
Films using stop-motion animation
The Howling films
American werewolf films
Films scored by Pino Donaggio
Films based on American horror novels
1981 independent films
American exploitation films
1980s American films
Films about amnesia
Films about television people
Resurrection in film
Films about adultery in the United States